Samuel Foster (died 1652) was an English mathematician and astronomer. He made several observations of eclipses, both of the sun and moon, at Gresham College and in other places; and he was known particularly for inventing and improving planetary instruments.

Life
A native of Northamptonshire, he was admitted a sizar at Emmanuel College, Cambridge on 23 April 1616, as a member of which he proceeded B.A. in 1619, and M.A. in 1623. On the death of Henry Gellibrand, he was elected Gresham Professor of Astronomy on 2 March 1636, but resigned later in the year and was succeeded by Mungo Murray. In 1641, Murray having vacated the professorship by his marriage, Foster was re-elected on 26 May.

During the civil war and Commonwealth he was one of the society of gentlemen who met in London for cultivating the 'new philosophy,' in the group around Charles Scarburgh. In 1646 John Wallis received from Foster a theorem on spherical triangles which he afterwards published in his Mechanica. Wallis's retrospective account of the origins of the Royal Society made Foster's lectures a rendezvous of the London-based Scarburgh-Jonathan Goddard group; but it is disputed to what extent this connection was with Gresham College and its tradition, rather than simply the location.

Foster died at Gresham College in May 1652, and was buried in the church of St. Peter the Poor in Broad Street.

Works
He published little himself, but many treatises written by him were printed after his death, though John Twysden and Edmund Wingate, his editors, state that long illness caused them to be left very imperfect, and Twysden complains that some people had taken advantage of his liberality by publishing his works as their own (Preface to Foster's Miscellanies). In the following list of his works the first two only were published by himself:

'The Use of the Quadrant,' London, 1624. An octavo edition was published soon after the author's death in 1652 by A. Thompson, who says in his preface that the additional lines were invented, and the uses written, for an 'appendix' to Edmund Gunter's 'Quadrant;' only a few copies were printed alone for Foster's friends. Other editions appear among Gunter's 'Works,' 1653, 1662, and 1673. 
'The Art of Dialling; by a new, easie, and most speedy way,' London, 1638. An edition published in 1675, has several additions and variations taken from the author's own manuscript, and also a 'Supplement' by the editor, William Leybourn. John Collins published in 1659 'Geometrical Dyalling, being a full explication of divers difficulties in the works of learned Mr. Samuel Foster.' 
'Posthuma Forsteri, the description of a ruler, upon which is inscribed divers scales and the uses thereof. Invented and written by Mr. Samuel Forster' [edited by Edmund Wingate], London, 1652.
 'Elliptical or Azimuthal Horologiography, comprehending severall wayes of describing dials upon all kindes of superficies, either plain or curved; and unto upright stiles in whatsoever position they shall be placed. Invented and demonstrated by Samuel Foster' [edited by John Twysden and Edmund Wingate], 4 pts, London, 1654. 
'Miscellanea: siue lucubrationes mathematics. Miscellanies: or Mathematical lucubrations of Mr. Samuel Foster, published, and many of them translated into English, by ... John Twysden. . . . Whereunto he hath annexed some things of his own. (Epitome Aristarchi Samii de magnitudinibus et distantiis . . . solis, lunae, et terrae. Lemmata Archimedis ... e ... codice MS. Arabico a Johanne Gravio traducta. A short treatise of fortifications, by J. T. [i.e. J. Twysden?]. Extract of a letter [on dialling] by Im. Halton. Aequations arising from a quantity divided into two unequal parts: and the second book of Euclides Elements, demonstrated by species by John Leeke).' Latin and English, 19 pts. fol. London, 1659. 
'The Sector altered, and other scales added, with the description and use thereof,' an improvement of Gunter's sector, and printed in the fourth and fifth editions of his 'Works,' 1662 and 1673, by William Leybourn, who in the latter edition corrected some mistakes which had appeared in the former from Foster's own manuscript.
 'The Description and Use of the Nocturnal; with the Addition of a Ruler, shewing the Measures of Inches and other Parts of most Countries, compared with our English ones,' [London? 1685?].

Foster left numerous manuscript treatises in addition to those printed by his friends. Of these two were in the possession of William Jones, F.R.S.: 'The Uses of a General Quadrant,' and 'Select Uses of the Quadrant,'  dated 1649.

Notes

References

Year of birth missing
1652 deaths
17th-century English mathematicians
17th-century English astronomers